ǁXegwi, also known as Batwa, is an extinct ǃKwi language spoken at Lake Chrissie in South Africa, near the Swazi border. The last known speaker, Jopi Mabinda, was murdered in 1988. However, a reporter for the South African newspaper Mail & Guardian reports that ǁXegwi may still be spoken in the Chrissiesmeer district.

The ǁXegwi name for their language has been spelled giǁkwi꞉gwi or kiǁkwi꞉gwi.  Their name for themselves has been transcribed tlou tle or kxlou-kxle, presumably .  The Nguni (Zulu and Swazi) called them (a)batwa, amaNkqeshe, amaNgqwigqwi; the Sotho called them Baroa/Barwa.

Phonology
It reacquired  from Nguni Bantu languages, but clicks remained relatively infrequent, compared to other Tuu languages. It also had a series of uvular plosives not found in other Tuu languages.

References

External links
 ǁXegwi basic lexicon at the Global Lexicostatistical Database

Extinct languages of Africa
Tuu languages
Languages of South Africa
Languages extinct in the 1980s